Patrick Neeson Lynch (March 10, 1817 – February 26, 1882) was an Irish-born prelate of the Roman Catholic Church. He served as bishop of the Diocese of Charleston in the Southeastern United States from 1857 until his death in 1882.

Biography

Early life 
Patrick Lynch's birthplace is sometimes attributed to Clones, County Monaghan but he was actually born in the County Fermanagh portion of the Parish of Clones, probably in the townland of Kibberidogue. His parents were Conlaw Peter and Eleanor (née Neison) Lynch. Eleanor's father disapproved of the marriage and disinherited her.  

In 1819, the Lynch family immigrated to the United States, settling in Cheraw, South Carolina.  Like their neighbors, they became slave owners. Lynch was one of fourteen children, twelve of whom lived to maturity. One sister became a Carmelite nun in Baltimore, another sister became an Ursuline nun; his brother John became a doctor in Columbia, South Carolina. 

Lynch studied at the diocesan Seminary of St. John the Baptist, then went to the Pontifical Urban College in Rome, where he graduated with a Doctor of Divinity degree.

Priesthood 
Lynch was ordained to the priesthood in Charleston on April 5, 1840.  After his ordination, he was assigned to the Cathedral of Saint John and Saint Finbar in Charleston. He was for a time editor of the United States Catholic Miscellany, founded by Bishop John England.  Bishop Reynolds appointed Lynch pastor of St. Mary's Parish in Charleston and as vicar-general.

Bishop of Charleston 
After the death of Bishop Reynolds in 1855, Lynch became administrator of the diocese, and succeeded him as bishop. He was consecrated as bishop on March 14, 1858. Lynch was the third bishop of the Diocese of Charleston, which at the time covered North Carolina, South Carolina, Georgia, the Bahamas and Bermuda. It was later subdivided, leaving the Diocese of Charleston to cover only the state of South Carolina.

Civil War 

A major fire in December 1861 destroyed the Cathedral of Saint John and Saint Finbar, the bishop's residence, and other property, along with the diocesan library. The bombardment of Charleston by the Union Army for nearly two years during the American Civil War closed most of the churches and impoverished the congregations.

Confederate delegate to the Holy See 
On February 20, 1864, Lynch was named by President Jefferson Davis of the Confederate States of America (CSA) to be its delegate to the Holy See. Lynch then travelled to Rome.  Since the Vatican had never recognized the CSA, Lynch did not present his diplomatic credentials to  Pope Pius IX, who received him only in as a bishop. Like his predecessors, Pius had condemned slavery.  During Lynch's audience, Pius suggested that "something might be done looking to an improvement in [the slaves'] position or state, and to a gradual preparation for their freedom at a future opportune time."

Postwar 
In the 1865 burning of Columbia, South Carolina, St. Mary's College, the Sisters' Home, and the Ursuline Convent were all destroyed.  After the end of the war, President Andrew Johnson pardoned Lynch for his role as delegate for the Confederacy.  With a diocesan debt exceeding $200,000, Lynch began soliciting donations throughout the country for the immediate needs of his diocese and to pay off the debt. Lynch attended the First Vatican Council in 1869 to 1870.  Lynch died in Charleston on February 26, 1882, at age 64

Lynch was a granduncle of US Navy Admiral Patrick N. L. Bellinger.

References

Further reading
 Corr, Seán. "Bishop Patrick Lynch of Charleston and his visit to Roslea in 1864." Clogher Record, vol. 20, no. 2, 2010, pp. 359–372.
 Heisser, David C. R., and Stephen J. White Sr. Patrick N. Lynch, 1817-1882: Third Catholic Bishop of Charleston (Columbia: University of South Carolina Press, 2015) 271 pp.
 
 Robert Emmett Curran, ed. For Church and Confederacy: The Lynches of South Carolina (Columbia: University of South Carolina Press, 2019), 410 pp.

1817 births
1882 deaths
Roman Catholic bishops of Charleston
19th-century Roman Catholic bishops in the United States
Irish emigrants to the United States (before 1923)
People of South Carolina in the American Civil War
American slave owners